Parallel Universes, A Memoir from the Edges of Space and Time is a non-fiction Christian book and a personal and science memoir written by Linda Morabito Meyer, the NASA discoverer of the volcanic activity on Jupiter's Io.  The book documents the author's several near-death experiences and purported visits to Heaven between 1954 and 1956; the author's quest to uncover a hidden past from 2003 to 2011; and the events of the author's major NASA science discovery in 1979.

Summary
During the time the memoir was compiled, a fifty-year-old mystery in Morabito Meyer's life was solved.  She discovered that her parents had been members of the Temple of the Abundant Life in Vancouver, British Columbia, Canada, run by a convicted criminal who was wanted on outstanding warrants in the United States.  William Franklin Wolsey was masquerading as a Bishop in this cult, and was the target of investigative reporting by the Vancouver Sun newspaper. The author's memories of horrific childhood abuse documented in the book, corresponded to the events reported in the news in 1959, at the time she learned about the cult in 2011. This information is summarized in the book's epilogue.  Her memories included near death experiences as a result of her parents’ involvement with William Franklin Wolsey, in which she remembers visiting Heaven and seeing Jesus.  Meyer maintains that William Franklin Wolsey was responsible for the deaths of four children she witnessed.  Meyer, who moved with her parents to the United States in 1961, became an astronomer and working for NASA's Jet Propulsion Laboratory on NASA's Voyager mission to Jupiter, discovered the volcanic activity on Jupiter's moon Io in 1979.  The memoir interleaves the author's noteworthy science, personal, and religious experiences.

The book interweaves three journeys told in the author's words.  She expresses her love of astronomy, which led her to make the discovery of the volcanic activity on Jupiter's moon Io in 1979. The discovery is considered the largest of NASA's planetary exploration program.

She expresses the horror of a childhood marred by her parents' involvement with a Vancouver, British Columbia, Canada cult between the years of 1954 and 1956. To aid victims of childhood abuse, the author highlights a treatment used for post traumatic stress disorder.

Kindle release
On November 16, 2010, Linda Morabito Meyer provided an early version of the book in Amazon Kindle electronic format, with the ability for the public to update the book through Amazon.com at no charge, as Morabito Meyer's investigation into her past was completed. The Kindle version was updated to match the final version of the book released in paperback on October 13, 2011.

References

Further reading
Morabito, Meyer, Linda (2011-10-13). Parallel Universes, A Memoir from the Edges of Space and Time. Heavens an Imprint of SciRel Publishing. .

External links
Official site
Promotional site
Interview with Linda Morabito by Bob McCauley on Superwire.

2011 non-fiction books
Books about near-death experiences
American memoirs